James Francis Gardner (born 27 September 1967) is a Scottish former professional football winger.

A product of non-league Ayresome North, Gardner signed for amateur Scottish Football League club Queen's Park in April 1987. He moved on to Motherwell in the summer of 1987 but made only 16 league appearances in five years with the club. He joined St Mirren in September 1993 before moving to the English Football League, initially with Scarborough and then Cardiff City and Exeter City. He returned to Scottish league football in 1999 to play for Stirling Albion and then Arbroath before finishing with non-league Shettleston.

References

1967 births
Living people
Footballers from Dunfermline
Scottish footballers
Association football wingers
Queen's Park F.C. players
Motherwell F.C. players
St Mirren F.C. players
Scarborough F.C. players
Cardiff City F.C. players
Exeter City F.C. players
Stirling Albion F.C. players
Arbroath F.C. players
Glasgow United F.C. players
Scottish Football League players
English Football League players
Scottish Junior Football Association players